Hire a Woman is a 2019 Nigerian romantic comedy film produced by Chinneylove Eze and directed by Ifeanyi Ikpoenyi, and starring Uzor Arukwe, Nancy Isime, and Alexx Ekubo. It was a box office success, the highest grossing Nigerian film in March 2019.

Plot summary 
Jide is invited to a reunion with his friends from university. To make his ex-girlfriend jealous and with the connivance of other female friends, he hires his best friend, Teni, to pose as his girlfriend. The ruse backfires and leads to them falling in love.

Cast 
 Uzor Arukwe as Jide
 Nancy Isime as Teni
 Belinda Effah as Zainab
 Alexx Ekubo as Emeka
 Ifu Enadda as Jane
 Mike Godson as Nat
 Erica Nlewedim as Nifemi
 Uche Nwaefuna as Toyosi

Production 
Hire a Woman followed 2017's Hire a Man, also produced by Eze and also starring Isime; Eze said that it was not a sequel, but centred around friendship, whereas the earlier film centred around family. Shooting took place at Whispering Palms Resort in Badagry.

Reception
Released nationwide on 29 March 2019, the film was a box office success, grossing ₦20.8 million and achieving the month's highest box-office take among Nigerian films and third highest of all films in Nigerian theatres.

References

External links 

 

2019 films
2019 romantic comedy films
Nigerian romantic comedy films
English-language Nigerian films
Films shot in Nigeria
2010s English-language films